The Romanian National R&D Computer Network (Rețeaua Națională de calculatoare pentru cercetare-dezvoltare) is the official registry for the .ro top-level domain.

External links
 Home page
 Whois lookup for .ro

Computer networks